Roald Dahl: Collected Stories is a hardcover edition of short-stories by Roald Dahl for adults. It was published in the US in October 2006 by Random House as part of the Everyman Library. The present volume includes for the first time all the stories in chronological order as established by Dahl's biographer, Jeremy Treglown, in consultation with the Dahl estate. A few of the short stories were not published chronologically in book form, but appeared later, collected in More Tales of the Unexpected (1980).  The collection contains all of the short stories published in the following collections:
Over to You: Ten Stories of Flyers and Flying (1946)
Someone Like You (1953)
Kiss Kiss (1959)
Switch Bitch (1974)
More Tales of the Unexpected (1980)

References

Short story collections by Roald Dahl
2006 short story collections